The Devil's Honey, aka Dangerous Obsession is a 1986 Italian erotic drama film directed by Lucio Fulci. It is one of his last major films to be released.

Plot

Johnny and Jessica are two young lovers embroiled in the throes of wild passion. Johnny is a musician obsessed with sex and carries the protesting but breathless Jessica along with his erotic charm. The film opens at a recording studio where Johnny calls Jessica into the booth after taking a break playing his saxophone and sexually fondles her before other techs arrive and Jessica is forced to leave.

Meanwhile, Dr. Wendell Simpson is a surgeon with marital problems. He never makes love to his unhappy wife Carol and is obsessed with his work at the hospital. Carol has recently discovered that Simpson makes regular visits to prostitutes during and after work. He visits a call girl named Anna at a local hotel, where after fondling her and having quick but unsatisfying sex, he forces her to leave after paying her.

The next day, Johnny continues his torrid affair with Jessica by forcing her to fondle him while riding his motorcycle. Afterward, at their house, while Johnny fools around by riding around on his motorcycle, he falls and hits his head on a stone plate. At first, he appears fine, but later in the recording studio, he collapses into a coma brought on by an apparent subdural hematoma.

That evening, Carol demands a divorce from Dr. Simpson when he is called to the hospital in the operating room to perform emergency brain surgery on an injured musician. Carol follows Simpson right to the O.R. and springs the divorce plans she has for him again. Simpson's mind wanders during the operation, and Johnny dies on the operating table. Driving away from the hospital, Simpson is chased by the grief-stricken Jessica, who swears revenge on her boyfriend's "killer".

Jessica starts sending threatening notes and making harassing phone calls to Simpson at his office. At a private golf club, Simpson and Carol are playing on the links when they decide to make one final attempt to patch up their marriage. Carol entices her husband to bed. Just as things start to happen as Simpson begins having sex with Carol, the telephone rings. After more than a dozen or more rings, Simpson feels compelled to answer despite the urgency of his wife's needs. He rolls off her to pick up the phone, but the phone rings off before he can answer. However, the damage is done. Carol gets up, dresses, and walks out on him for good. Seconds later, the telephone rings again. When Simpson picks it up right away, he hears Jessica's voice again saying, "Why did you let him die?"

Jessica becomes steadily more deranged with grief, spending hours watching home videos of Johnny. The next day she pulls a gun on Simpson as he gets into his car to go to the hospital. Forcing him to drive to her house, she chloroforms him when they arrive and ties him up. Simpson regains consciousness to find an Alsatian dog barking furiously at him, tied up just inches away. Outside, Jessica is smashing his car with an axe. She then informs her captive that she intends to kill him but only when ready. Jessica then humiliate her captive by forcing him to eat dog food and having him lick her bare abdomen smeared with his own blood from a wound she inflicts on him. Simpson finds himself strangely and perversely attracted to his tormentor. Jessica's sadistic games go further when she forces Simpson at gunpoint to down to the beach outside the house. While dragging him on a leash, she says she intends to drown him and almost does by holding him under the water of the surf. But then she suddenly changes her mind and, in a panic, pulls Simpson out of the water and revives him.

In a series of flashbacks, Jessica's memories are shown of her dead lover, which become more ambivalent as she recalls some of the cruelties and excesses Johnny was capable of. A baby she'd been carrying from her affair with Johnny miscarried at an early stage, and her periods resume. In the present, her pet dog dies as well, and Jessica buries him on the beach. Growing ever more melancholic, she engages in further sex games with the submissive Simpson, who listens with compassion to Jessica's ramblings about her life with Johnny, until she recalls a final recollection that changes her mind about Johnny.

Several months earlier, during a vacation getaway to Venice, Italy, Johnny bought Jessica an expensive bracelet from a local vendor to symbolize their love for one another. Johnny and Jessica went to a local cinema with one of Johnny's friends, Nicky, a musical associate. The two lovers embraced in a passionate kiss during the movie, but Jessica was horrified to discover that Johnny was simultaneously letting Nicky go down on him. The memory of this kinky ménage-a-trois was the last straw.

Back in the present, Jessica, finally seeing the self-destructive person Johnny was, walks to the ocean and throws the "mystical bracelet" Johnny bought for her into the water. Jessica returns to the house where she unties Simpson and tells him that he is free to go. Jessica goes upstairs to her bedroom, strips off all her clothes, lies down on her bed, and puts the pistol to her head, intending to kill herself. Seconds later, the besotted Simpson walks willingly into her bedroom and stops her from committing suicide by having sex with her as both of them are now drawn into a torrid passion of their own making. The film ends with Simpson and Jessica lying side by side in bed when Simpson recites a poem to Jessica that he said earlier in the movie: "When you have spent your life like a fortune that never seemed to end. A second chance will come like a long lost friend. Great joy will fill you and flush you hot. No more will you ever be cool for she is the Devil's honey pot. And you'll drown in her you fool."

Cast
 Blanca Marsillach as Jessica
 Brett Halsey as Dr. Wendell Simpson
 Stefano Madia as  Johnny
 Corinne Cléry as  Carol Simpson
 Paula Molina as  Sandra
 Bernard Seray as  Nicky

Release
The Devil's Honey was released on August 14, 1986.

In the United States, a cut version of the film was released on VHS under the title Dangerous Obsession by A.I.P. Home Video. On September 26, 2017, the film was released on blu-ray by Severin Films, which contains the film in its uncut form with English and Italian audio tracks as well as interviews with Brett Halsey, Corinne Clery, Vincenzo Salviani and Claudio Natili, and the featurette "Stephen Thrower on The Devil's Honey".

See also
 List of Italian films of 1986

References

Sources

External links
 

1986 films
1980s Italian-language films
Italian erotic drama films
1980s erotic drama films
Films directed by Lucio Fulci
1986 drama films
1980s Italian films